Jackson Township is an inactive township in Clinton County, in the U.S. state of Missouri.

Jackson Township was established in 1833, and named after President Andrew Jackson.

References

Townships in Missouri
Townships in Clinton County, Missouri